
AD 99 (XCIX) was a common year starting on Tuesday (link will display the full calendar) of the Julian calendar. At the time, it was known as the Year of the Consulship of Palma and Senecio (or, less frequently, year 852 Ab urbe condita). The denomination AD 99 for this year has been used since the early medieval period, when the Anno Domini calendar era became the prevalent method in Europe for naming years.

Events

By place

Roman Empire 
 Emperor Trajan returns to Rome from an inspection of the Roman legions along the Rhine and Danube frontiers.
 Emissaries of the Kushan Empire reach the Roman Empire.
 Richimerus I fights a battle with a combined army of Romans and Gauls at Basana near Aachen.

 29 August - Papyrus Oxyrhynchus 581, recording the sale of a slave girl, is written.

By topic

Religion 
 23 November - Pope Evaristus succeeds Pope Clement I as the fifth pope according to Roman Catholic tradition.

Births 
 Narcissus of Jerusalem, Christian bishop and saint (d. c. 216)

Deaths 
 Clement I, pope of the Catholic Church

References 

0099